'Décimas de um Cantador' is the tenth solo album by Brazilian musician Zé Ramalho. It was released in 1987. The back cover features a picture of Ramalho playing the acoustic guitar with a razor; a reference to his cocaine usage at that time.

Track listing

Personnel 
 Zé Ramalho - Twelve-string guitar, acoustic guitar, lead vocals
 Mauro Motta - Keyboards
 Robson Jorge - Keyboards, acoustic and electric guitars, bass guitar
 Chico Guedes - Bass guitar
 Claudia Olivetti - Choir
 Sônia Bonfá - Choir
 Marisa Fossa - Choir
 Zilma - Choir
 Lincoln Olivetti - Programming
 Ariovaldo - Rhythm

References

 

1987 albums
Zé Ramalho albums
Epic Records albums